King Stephen can refer to a number of individuals. Note that medieval rulers in Serbia and Bosnia used Stephen as an honorific as well as a personal name.

Kings named Stephen include:

Rulers of Bosnia
Stjepan Ostojić (r. 1418-1420)
Stjepan Tomašević (d. 1463)

Rulers of Croatia
Stjepan Držislav (r. 969 - c. 997)
Stjepan I of Croatia (c. 988 - 1058)
Stjepan II of Croatia (r. 1089 - 1090 or 1091)

Rulers of England
Stephen of Blois (1092 or 1096 - 1154)

Rulers of Hungary
Stephen I of Hungary (c. 975 - 1038), Saint Stephen of Hungary
Stephen II of Hungary (1101-1131)
Stephen III of Hungary (1147-1172)
Stephen IV of Hungary (1133–1165)
Stephen V of Hungary (c. 1239 - 1272)

Rulers of Poland
Stefan Batory (died 1586), King of Poland, Prince of Transylvania

Rulers of Serbia
Stefan the First-Crowned
other kings of Serbia as an honorific

Musical works
Musical works with Saint Stephen of Hungary as subject:
King Stephen (1811), by Ludwig van Beethoven
István király (1885), (King Stephen), opera by Ferenc Erkel
István, a király (1984), rock opera

See also
Stephen King (disambiguation)